Ángela Noelia Díaz Vázquez (born 28 November 1999) is a Puerto Rican footballer who plays as a forward for Bayamón FC and the Puerto Rico women's national team.

International goals
Scores and results list Puerto Rico's goal tally first.

References

1999 births
Living people
Women's association football forwards
Puerto Rican women's footballers
Puerto Rico women's international footballers